Beriota is a village on the south-eastern coast of New Ireland, Papua New Guinea. It lies to the north-east of Bakop, and is located in Konoagil Rural LLG. There is coral in the area.

References

Populated places in New Ireland Province